The 2011 Allan Cup was the Canadian championship of senior ice hockey.  This was the 103rd year the Allan Cup was awarded.  The 2011 Allan Cup was contended in Kenora, Ontario, hosted by the Kenora Thistles of Hockey Northwestern Ontario from April 11 to April 16, 2011.

Newfoundland and Labrador's Clarenville Caribous went 4 wins, no losses in the tournament, defeating the Alberta's Bentley Generals 5-3 in the final to win Newfoundland and Labrador's 2nd ever National Senior AAA crown, the first since the Corner Brook Royals at the 1986 Allan Cup.

Participants
Kenora Thistles (Host)
4-1-0-0 Branch record (1st in Hockey Northwestern Ontario).
Automatic entry as host.
Fort Frances Thunderhawks (Northwestern Ontario)
1-3-0-1 Branch record (2nd in Hockey Northwestern Ontario).
Granted Quebec's spot in Allan Cup.
Clarenville Caribous (Atlantic)
14-10-0-0 Regular season record (2nd in West Coast Senior Hockey League).
Lost to Deer Lake Red Wings 4-games-to-2 in Semi-final.
Only registered Sr. AAA team in Atlantic.
Bentley Generals (Pacific)
19-1-0-0 Regular season record (1st in Chinook Hockey League).
Defeated Stony Plain Eagles 4-games-to-none, defeated Fort Saskatchewan Chiefs 4-games-to-none to win Alberta Crown.
Defeated Fort St. John Flyers 3-games-to-2 for McKenzie Cup.
South East Prairie Thunder (West)
6-1-0-0 Provincial round robin record (1st in Hockey Manitoba).
Defeated Île-des-Chênes North Stars 4-games-to-1 to win Pattison Cup.
Defeated Lloydminster Border Kings 3-games-to-none to win Rathgaber Cup.
Dundas Real McCoys (Ontario)
11-9-3-1 Regular season record (3rd in Major League Hockey).
Defeated Brantford Blast 4-games-to-2, defeated Norwood Vipers 4-games-to-3 to win Robertson Cup.

Round robin

Results

Championship Round

Quarter and Semi-finals

Final

References

External links
Kenora Allan Cup Site
Official Allan Cup Site 

Allan Cup
Allan Cup
Sport in Kenora